The 2016 Malaysia FAM Cup (referred to as the FAM Cup or FAM League) is the 65th season of the Malaysia FAM League since its establishment in 1952. The league is currently the third level football league in Malaysia. Melaka United are the previous champion and currently play in the second level of Malaysian football, Malaysia Premier League. For 2016 season, there are 18 teams will compete in the league where 11 teams are from last season while 7 new teams entered the competition.

Teams

Participation approved by FAM :-

  AirAsia F.C.
  DYS F.C. ( New Team )
  FELCRA F.C.
  Hanelang F.C.
  KDMM F.C.  ( New Team )
  Megah Murni F.C.
  MISC-MIFA
  MOF F.C.
  MPKB-BRI U-Bes F.C. ( New Team )
  PB Melayu Malaysia ( New Team )
  Penjara F.C.
  PKNP F.C. ( New Team )
  SAMB FC ( New Team )
  Shahzan Muda F.C.
  Sungai Ara F.C.
  UKM F.C.

Season Changes

( Promoted To 2016 Malaysia Premier League )
  Perlis FA
  Melaka United

( To 2016 Malaysia President's Cup )
  Johor Darul Ta'zim III F.C.

( Withdrawn )
  Harimau Muda C
  Putrajaya SPA F.C. (Relegated from 2015 Malaysia Premier League)
  Kedah United F.C.
  Real Mulia F.C.
  PBAPP F.C.
  TNB Kilat F.C. (New team)
  Young Fighters F.C.

Team summaries

Stadium and locations

Personnel and kits
Note: Flags indicate national team as has been defined under FIFA eligibility rules. Players and Managers may hold more than one non-FIFA nationality.

Coaching changes

Results

Group A

League table

Result table

Group B

League table

Result table

Knock-out stage

Bracket

Quarter-finals

First leg

Second leg

Semi-finals

First leg

Second leg

Final

First leg

Second leg

Champions

Statistics

Scorers

Top scorers

Own goal

See also

 2016 Malaysia Super League
 2016 Malaysia Premier League
 2016 Malaysia FA Cup
 2016 Malaysia President's Cup
 2016 Malaysia Youth League
 List of Malaysian football transfers 2016
 List of Malaysian football transfers summer 2016

References

External links
 Football Association of Malaysia
 SPMB 

5
2016